Albert Levan (8 March 1905 – 28 March 1998) was a Swedish botanist and geneticist.

Albert Levan is best known today for co-authoring the report in 1956 that humans had forty-six chromosomes (instead of forty-eight, as previously believed). This epochal discovery was made by Joe Hin Tjio in Levan's laboratory.

Originally specialising in plant cytology, Levan later turned to the similarities in the chromosome structure of cancer cells and errors introduced to plant cells via chemical or radioactive elements. These studies later led to examination of chromosomes in animal cells.

Levan was elected a member of the Royal Swedish Academy of Sciences in 1967.

He was cited by professor Bryan Sykes in Adam's Curse: A Future Without Men

References

Tjio JH, Levan A. The chromosome number of man. Hereditas 1956; vol. 42, pages 1–6.

1905 births
1998 deaths
Swedish geneticists
Members of the Royal Swedish Academy of Sciences
20th-century Swedish botanists